There are three species of lizard named Hispaniolan green anole:

 Anolis chlorocyanus, endemic to Hispaniola
 Anolis callainus, found in the Dominican Republic
 Anolis peynadoi, found in the Dominican Republic